Relax Edition 5 is the thirteenth studio album by Trance duo Blank & Jones.

Track listing
CD1
 J'en Reste L (with Coralie Clement) 03:02
 Hang Loose 03:46
 Survivor (with Mike Francis) 04:03
 Jet Set 05:47
 Comment Te Dire Adieu 02:44
 Bossa Per Emilia (with Mike Francis) 02:46
 Luftschloss 07:03
 Lazy Life (Late Night Version) (with Jason Caesar) 06:37
 Morning Sun 05:58
 Morning Sun (Cruisin') 03:57
 Stardust 08:36
 Quedate (Ambient Mix) (with Mystic Diversions) 05:01
 Moonlight Over Maldives 04:53
 Freelove (with Bobo) 06:32
 Worldwhite 02:53

CD2

 Miracle Man (with Cathy Battistessa) 05:39
 Midsummer Dream 05:17
 Quedate (Moonshine Mix) (with Mystic Diversions) 06:17
 Bien 06:37
 Freelove (Sunset Session Mix) (with Bobo) 06:18
 Comment Te Dire Adieu (Beach House Mix) 04:07
 Flying High 06:39
 Easy Living 05:45
 Give It Up 06:01
 Pushin' 05:22

Blank & Jones albums
2010 albums